Frank W. Davis (August 24, 1936 – September 9, 2018) was an American politician and lawyer based in Oklahoma. Born in Ada, Oklahoma, he was a graduate of the Oklahoma University School of Law. A Republican, he served in the Oklahoma House of Representatives for 26 years, from 1978 to 2004.

Biography
He was raised on a farm between Francis and Ada, Oklahoma, in Pontotoc County. He attended the East Central University, where he graduated with a bachelor's degree in history and government in 1958. Davis began his legal studies at the University of Illinois College of Law and transferred to the University of Oklahoma College of Law, graduating in 1959. He then served as acting postmaster of Ada, and worked for attorney Denny Faulkenburg before assuming the post of Logan County attorney from 1961 to 1965. Davis began his private practice in 1965, and was judge of the Guthrie Municipal Court from 1974 to 1978. He also continued working as a lawyer while he sat on the Oklahoma House of Representatives, where he served as a Republican between 1978 and 2004. Upon leaving the state legislature, Davis focused on his legal practice in Guthrie, Oklahoma. Davis was still practicing law at the time of his death.

Organizations
Davis was active in several organizations, including:
 The Gideons International
 Guthrie Lions Club (for nearly 60 years)
 Guthrie Masonic Consistory
 Boy Scouts of America

Davis died of a heart attack at his home in Guthrie on September 9, 2018. He was survived by his wife and two children.

References

1936 births
2018 deaths
Republican Party members of the Oklahoma House of Representatives
Oklahoma lawyers
East Central University alumni
University of Illinois College of Law alumni
University of Oklahoma College of Law alumni
District attorneys in Oklahoma
People from Guthrie, Oklahoma
People from Pontotoc County, Oklahoma
Oklahoma postmasters
20th-century American lawyers